Kenneth I. Gordon (born November 4, 1959) is an American attorney and state legislator representing the 21st Middlesex District in the Massachusetts House of Representatives. The district includes Burlington, Bedford, and Wilmington's Precinct 3. He is a Bedford resident and a member of the Democratic Party.

Education and career 
Gordon graduated from Ledyard High school in 1977 before going on to attend Northeastern University. After graduating from Northeastern with a degree in journalism, he worked as a sports writer and editor affiliated with the Boston Globe, the Palm Beach Post and Evening Times, and The Sporting News magazine.

Gordon attained his JD cum laude at Suffolk University Law School. After working at various law firms, he chose to open Gordon Law Office, LLC in 2000 where he specializes in workplace discrimination and harassment and commercial or corporate disputes among and within businesses. He is a former member of the Massachusetts Employment Lawyers Association and National Employment Lawyers Association.

Massachusetts House of Representatives 
Gordon was elected to serve in the Massachusetts House of Representatives in 2012. As a representative, Gordon is the House Chair of the Joint Committee on Public Service. Gordon was previously the Vice Chair of the Joint Committee on Election Laws, the Vice Chair of the Joint Committee on Economic Development and Emerging Technologies and also served as a member of the Joint Committee on Transportation, the Joint Committee on Community Development and Small Businesses, and the House Committee on Bonding, Capital Expenditures and State Assets. In 2018, the Massachusetts legislature used the principles of a bill he filed to create a Paid Family and Medical Leave program, which was signed into law as part of a "Grand Bargain" bill.

Personal 
Gordon lives in Bedford with his wife, Breena Daniell, and their son, Brandon. In Bedford, he served as vice-chair of the Zoning Board, and is past chair of the Bedford Cultural Council. Gordon was a long time volunteer for Bedford's All Night Graduation Party.

He hosts Rappin' with the Rep, a monthly cable access show on Burlington Community Access Television.

See also
 2019–2020 Massachusetts legislature
 2021–2022 Massachusetts legislature

References

Jewish American state legislators in Massachusetts
Living people
Democratic Party members of the Massachusetts House of Representatives
Northeastern University alumni
People from Bedford, Massachusetts
Sportswriters from Massachusetts
Suffolk University Law School alumni
The Boston Globe people
1959 births
21st-century American politicians
21st-century American Jews